The 2014–15 Santa Clara Broncos women's basketball team will represent Santa Clara University in the 2014–15 college basketball season. It is head coach JR Payne's first season at Santa Clara. The Broncos are members of the West Coast Conference and play their home games at the Leavey Center. They finished the season 11–18, 5–13 in WCC to finish in  seventh place. They advanced to the quarterfinals of the WCC women's tournament where they lost to San Diego.

Roster

Schedule and results

|-
!colspan=9 style="background:#F0E8C4; color:#AA003D;"| Exhibition

|-
!colspan=9 style="background:#AA003D; color:#F0E8C4;"| Regular Season

|-
!colspan=9 style="background:#F0E8C4;"| 2015 WCC Tournament

Rankings

See also
2014–15 Santa Clara Broncos men's basketball team
Santa Clara Broncos women's basketball

References

Santa Clara Broncos women's basketball seasons
Santa Clara
Santa Clara Broncos women's basketball
Santa Clara Broncos women's basketball